Val-du-Mignon is a commune in the Deux-Sèvres department in western France. It was established on 1 January 2019 by merger of the former communes of Usseau (the seat), Priaires and Thorigny-sur-le-Mignon.

See also
Communes of the Deux-Sèvres department

References

Communes of Deux-Sèvres